Norman Catherine (born September 1949 in East London, South Africa) is a South African artist whose body of work spans painting, sculpture, printmaking and mixed media.  He collaborated closely with iconic South African artist Walter Battiss on the Fook Island concept from 1973.

"In the thirty years spanning his past and present output, Catherine’s visual trademarks have included rough-edged comical and nightmarish forms, rendered in brash cartoon colours.  His idiosyncratic vision – a combination of dark cynicism and exuberant humour, as well as his innovative use of everyday material, has secured his place at the forefront of South African contemporary art"  Hazel Friedman on Norman Catherine .

He lives and works from his home, named Fook Manor, near the Hartbeespoort Dam outside of Pretoria.

External links
 South African History Online
 Official Norman Catherine website

South African contemporary artists
1949 births
Living people
South African male painters
20th-century South African male artists
21st-century South African male artists